Evgeny Donskoy was the defending champion but lost in the quarterfinals to Egor Gerasimov.

Gerasimov won the title after defeating Mikhail Kukushkin 7–6(11–9), 4–6, 6–4 in the final.

Seeds

Draw

Finals

Top half

Bottom half

References
Main Draw
Qualifying Draw

President's Cup (tennis) - Men's Singles
2017 Men's Singles